Mustapha Njie (born May 16, 1996) is a Gambian footballer who plays as a striker for LISCR FC in the Liberia First Division.

Bombada FC 
While playing for the Gambia Senior Secondary School, Njie was spotted by many clubs in the GFA League First Division and some other clubs in the second division of Gambian football. Njie joined the newly established club Bombada FC. In his first year with Bombada FC he led the club to the GFA League First Division from the second division. He netted 10 goals and gave 3 assists in his first season in the Gambian top flight to help Bombada FC remain in the top-flight They finished sixth on the 2014-15 league table. He scored seven goals in his second season in the First Division to help Bombada FC finish seventh in the league. 

His final year with the club began with a bad start. After seven league games, Bombada FC was unable to win a game as they sat bottom of the table with zero points. Despite their poor start, Njie managed to score seven times to help them finish eighth on the 2016-17 First Division table. His performance for Bombada FC over the year attracted clubs within the First Division that were after services. After the 2016-17 season had come to an end, Njie ended his time with Bombada FC when he agreed to join Liberia First Division club, LISCR FC.

LISCR FC 

Along with three other Gambians, Njie joined LISCR FC in 2017. His move to the Liberian side was heavily influenced by Gambian coach Tapha Manneh who is the current head coach of LISCR FC. Manneh joined LISCR FC before the start of the 2016-17 Liberian season and led the club to winning the 2016-17 Liberia First Division and Liberian Cup titles. Njie landed in Liberia in October 2017 to begin his career with the club that was preparing for the 2018 season and the 2018 CAF Champions League. After series of test matches with the LISCR FC including a preseason camp in Sierra Leone, Njie made his debut for the Shipping Boys in the preliminary round of the 2018 CAF Champions League against Sudan Premier League side Al-Hilal Club (Omdurman) on February 11 at the Antoinette Tubman Stadium in Monrovia.  He played all 90 minute to help LISCR FC win the first leg 1-0. However, his CAF Champions League debut ended in disappointment as LISCR FC lost 3-0 in Sudan and bowed out of the competition 3-1 on aggregate after the preliminary stage.

International career 

While featuring for Bombada FC in the GFA League First Division, Njie was called up to the Gambia squad for an African Nations Championship qualifier against Senegal. His debut ended with disappointment as Gambia failed to qualify ahead of Senegal, losing 1-0 in the return leg at the Independence Stadium in Gambia.

References

External links
 http://allafrica.com/stories/201507011394.html
 http://thepoint.gm/africa/gambia/article/bombada-fcs-key-performers-continue-to-boycott-training-sessions
 http://liscrfc.com/team.html
 http://www.bushchicken.com/liscr-fc-exits-caf-champions-league-with-loss-in-sudan/
 https://www.groupits.eu/players/mustapha-njie

1996 births
Living people
Gambian footballers
Association football forwards
The Gambia international footballers